Sumatra is an unincorporated community and census-designated place in Liberty County, Florida, United States. Its population was 148 as of the 2010 census. It is located on State Road 65. It is approximately 25 miles north of Eastpoint and 35 miles south of Hosford.

The Prospect Bluff Historic Sites are located in Sumatra.

References

Unincorporated communities in Liberty County, Florida
Unincorporated communities in Florida
Census-designated places in Florida
Census-designated places in Liberty County, Florida